Anton Dragúň (born 11 June 1942) is a former Slovak football player and former manager of TJ Baník Ružiná.

External links
 UTFS profile

References

1942 births
Living people
Slovak footballers
Slovak football managers
Slovak expatriate footballers
ŠK Slovan Bratislava managers
AS Trenčín managers
FK Inter Bratislava managers
Slovak Super Liga managers
Expatriate footballers in the Czech Republic
FK Dukla Banská Bystrica managers
FC DAC 1904 Dunajská Streda managers
FK Dubnica managers
SV Horn managers
FK Iskra Borčice managers

Association footballers not categorized by position